Crenicichla iguapina is a species of cichlid native to South America. It is found in the Rio Ribeira de Igupae drainage in Brazil.

References

iguapina
Freshwater fish of Brazil
Taxa named by Sven O. Kullander
Taxa named by Carlos Alberto Santos de Lucena
Fish described in 2006